Doreen Mirembe (born 4 October 1987), is a Ugandan actress, filmmaker, producer, founder of Amani (a film company) and dental assistant at Pan Dental Surgery. She has acted in numerous films and TV series as well as producing her own movies.

Career
In addition to several films and television commercials, Mirembe has appeared in TV series such as Deception NTV as Dr. Stephanie and Nana Kagga's Beneath The Lies as Miriam. She founded Amani House, her own film company. Her first film A Dog Story was an experimental film which garnered many nominations for Best Short Film and won two awards for Best Actor and Best Actress in a Short Film at the Pearl International Film Festival in 2006. She later produced her second and third film titled Nectar and Kafa Coh respectively.

Mirembe is an active in-service dental assistant at Pan Dental Surgery, Kampala.

Filmography

Nominations and awards

References

External links
 

Living people
Ugandan film actresses
Ugandan television actresses
People from Kampala
21st-century Ugandan actresses
Ugandan stage actresses
1987 births
MNFPAC alumni